The men's rings event was part of the gymnastics programme at the 1928 Summer Olympics. It was one of seven gymnastics events for men and it was contested for the fourth time after 1896, 1904, and 1924. Scores from the rings event were added to the results from other individual apparatus events to give aggregate scores for the individual and team all-around events. Eighty-eight gymnasts from eleven nations competed, with each nation having a team of 8 gymnasts. The event was won by Leon Štukelj of Yugoslavia, the nation's first medal in the rings event. For the second consecutive Games, Czechoslovakian gymnasts took both silver and bronze: Ladislav Vácha finished second and Emanuel Löffler is credited with a third place finish. Vácha, the bronze medalist in 1924, was the first man to win multiple medals in the event.

Löffler's bronze medal may be the result of a math error. His scores in the compulsory and voluntary exercises were 27.25 and 28.25, respectively, which would result in a total score of 55.50. This score is consistent with the individual all-around and team all-around scores for Löffler and Czechoslovakia. However, his total score is listed as 56.50 instead in the Official Report for the rings apparatus. A score of 55.50 would have placed Löffler fourth in the rings, behind Italy's Romeo Neri at 56.00.

Background

This was the fourth appearance of the event, which is one of the five apparatus events held every time there were apparatus events at the Summer Olympics (no apparatus events were held in 1900, 1908, 1912, or 1920). Six of the top 10 gymnasts from 1924 returned: bronze medalist Ladislav Vácha of Czechoslovakia, fourth-place finisher Leon Štukelj of Yugoslavia, fifth-place finisher Bedřich Šupčík of Czechoslovakia, seventh-place finisher Jan Koutný of Czechoslovakia, eighth-place finisher Ferdinando Mandrini of Italy, and ninth-place finisher Vittorio Lucchetti of Italy. The 1926 world championship podium had Štukelj (who had also won in 1922), Vácha, and Šupčík atop it, in that order.

The Netherlands made its debut in the men's rings. Hungary competed for the first time since 1896. The other nine nations had all competed in 1924. The United States made its third appearance, most of any nation.

Competition format

Each gymnast performed a compulsory exercise and a voluntary exercise. The maximum score for each exercise was 30 points. The rings was one of the apparatus used in the individual and team all-around scores.

Schedule

Results

Source: Official results; De Wael

References

 

Rings
Men's 1928
Men's events at the 1928 Summer Olympics